|}

The Prix La Flèche is a Listed flat horse race in France open to two-year-old thoroughbreds. It is run at Chantilly over a distance of 1,000 metres (about 5 furlongs), and it is scheduled to take place each year in June.

History
The event was staged at Le Tremblay until the late 1960s, and was transferred to Évry in the 1970s. For a period its distance was 1,400 metres. It was subsequently contested over 1,300 metres (1984–86) and 1,200 metres (1987–92). It was shortened to 1,100 metres in 1993.

The Prix La Flèche was held at Chantilly from 1997 to 1999, and at Maisons-Laffitte from 2000 to 2003. It was switched to Longchamp and cut to 1,000 metres in 2004. It returned to Maisons-Laffitte in 2009, and has been run at Chantilly again since 2014.

The leading horses from the race often go on to compete in the Prix du Bois.

Records
Leading jockey since 1977 (4 wins):
 Freddy Head – Ma Biche (1982), Minstrel's Lassie (1987), Hector Protector (1990), Arazi (1991)
 Christophe Soumillon – Ingeburg (2001), Salut Thomas (2004), Percolator (2008), Siyouni (2009)

Leading trainer since 1977 (5 wins):
 François Boutin – Stromboli (1977), Voukefalos (1978), Minstrel's Lassie (1987), Hector Protector (1990), Arazi (1991)

Leading owner since 1977 (3 wins):
 Sheikh Mohammed – Zieten (1992), Foxhound (1993), Scenery (1997)

Winners since 1977

Earlier winners

 1908: Prestissimo
 1909: Cerba
 1910: Blina
 1911: Quai des Fleurs
 1912: Coupesarte
 1913: Balancoire
 1914: Rossendale
 1921: Le Fanfaron
 1922: Lizard
 1923: Pot au Feu
 1924: Etoile d'Argent
 1925: Cerulea
 1926: Salvandy
 1927: Kantar
 1928: Kassala
 1929: Brise Lame
 1930: Ammonite
 1931: La Bourrasque
 1932: Finnoise
 1933: Fanar
 1934: Aromate
 1935: Sucrier
 1936: Chenonceaux
 1937: Trissino
 1938: For My Love
 1939: Maurepas
 1942: Caravelle
 1943: Orsova
 1958: Savarus
 1963: Sigebert
 1964: Polly Girl
 1966: Topyo
 1968: La Milanaise
 1969: Hand in Hand
 1974: Sissoo
 1976: Concerto Barocco

See also
 List of French flat horse races

References
 France Galop / Racing Post:

 pedigreequery.com – Prix La Flèche – Longchamp.

Flat horse races for two-year-olds
Chantilly Racecourse
Horse races in France